The Denmark women's national cricket team represents Denmark in international women's cricket. The team is organised by the Danish Cricket Federation, an associate member of the International Cricket Council (ICC).

Denmark's first recorded international fixture came against the Netherlands in 1983. The team made its One Day International (ODI) debut in 1989, at the European Championship, and went on to qualify for both the 1993 and 1997 World Cups, winning a single match at each tournament. Denmark played its last ODIs to date in 1999, and has played only in minor regional tournaments since then.

In April 2018, the ICC granted full Women's Twenty20 International (WT20I) status to all its members. Therefore, all Twenty20 matches played between Denmark women and other ICC members after 1 July 2018 will be a full WT20I.

History
Denmark's ODI debut came at the 1989 Women's European Cricket Cup, which they hosted, and placed as runners up in. They were also runners up in the 1991 tournament. They made two appearances in the World Cup, finishing 7th in 1993 and 10th in 1997. Their only ODIs outside the European Championship and World Cup were two series against The Netherlands played at the Mikkelberg-Kunst-und-Cricket Center in Germany in 1997 and 1998. Their most recent ODI was played against Netherlands on 21 July 1999. By this point women's cricket in Denmark was struggling for players with the Danish Cricket Federation reducing the national league to 8 players per side from the 2000 season.

Denmark returned to international competition in August 2013, featuring in a five-team tournament in Bologna (along with Estonia, Gibraltar, Italy, and Belgium). They finished runner-up to Italy, winning three out of four matches. In August 2014, Denmark played an international 20-over tournament in Berlin, with six other European teams. They won only two of their six matches (defeating both Gibraltar and Belgium by nine wickets), consequently finishing the tournament in fifth place, behind Italy, Germany, France, and Jersey.

Tournament history

World Cup 
1973–1988: Did not participate
1993: 7th place
1997: 10th place
2000–present: Did not participate

European Championship 
1989: Runners up
1990: 4th place
1991: Runners up
1995: 4th place
1999: 3rd place
2001: Did not participate
2005: Did not participate

Records and statistics
International Match Summary — Denmark Women
 
Last updated 29 May 2022

One-Day International

Highest team total: 185/8 (55.0 Overs) v Ireland, 18 July 1990 at Leicester Ivanhoe Cricket Club Ground, Kirby Muxloe.
Highest individual innings: 53, Janni Jonsson v Ireland, 18 July 1995 at Railway Union Sports Club, Dublin.
Best innings bowling: 4/6, Mette Gregersen v The Netherlands, 21 July 1999 at Nykøbing Mors Cricket Club Ground, Nykobing Mors.

Most ODI runs for Denmark Women 

Most ODI wickets for Denmark Women 

ODI record versus other nations

Records complete to Women ODI #306. Last updated 21 July 1999.

Twenty20 International
T20I record versus other nations

Records complete to WT20I #1088. Last updated 29 May 2022.

See also
 List of Denmark women ODI cricketers
 List of Denmark women Twenty20 International cricketers
 Denmark national cricket team

References

 
 
Women's national cricket teams
Women
1989 establishments in Denmark